Christopher Joshua Martin Piña (born July 5, 1986) is an American professional boxer in the Super Bantamweight division and is the current WBO NABO Super Bantamweight Champion.

Professional career
In August 2010, Martin upset an undefeated Christopher Avalos at the Grand Casino in Hinckley, Minnesota. The bout was televised on a Showtime undercard.

In May 2011, Christopher again won an upset, this time over contender Charles Huerta to win the vacant WBO NABO Super Bantamweight Championship. This bout was the main-event of a TeleFutura boxing card.

References

External links

American boxers of Mexican descent
Super-bantamweight boxers
1986 births
Living people
American male boxers
Boxers from San Diego